Kalikapur railway station is a Kolkata Suburban Railway Station on the Canning Branch line. It is under the jurisdiction of the Sealdah railway division in the Eastern Railway zone of the Indian Railways. Kalikapur railway station is situated beside Station Road at Benebou, Kalikapur in South 24 Parganas district in the Indian state of West Bengal.

History

Electrification

Station complex
The platform is very much well sheltered. The station possesses many facilities including water and sanitation. There is a proper approach road to this station.

References

Railway stations in South 24 Parganas district
Sealdah railway division
Kolkata Suburban Railway stations
Railway stations opened in 1862
1862 establishments in British India